Clema elegans is a species of jewel beetles in the genus Clema.

References

External links

 Clema elegans on www.biolib.cz

Buprestidae